The 2014–15 Georgia Bulldogs basketball team represented the University of Georgia during the 2014–15 NCAA Division I men's basketball season. The team's head coach was Mark Fox, who was in his sixth season at UGA. They played their home games at Stegeman Coliseum and were members of the Southeastern Conference. They finished the season 21–12, 11–7 in SEC play to finish in a four-way tie for third place. They advanced to the semifinals of the SEC tournament where they lost to Arkansas. They received an at-large bid to the NCAA tournament where they lost in the second round to Michigan State.

Before the season

Departures

Recruits Class of 2014

Recruits Class of 2015

Roster

Schedule and results

|-
!colspan=9 style="background:#000000; color:white;"| Exhibition

|-
!colspan=9 style="background:#000000; color:white;"| Non-conference games

|-
!colspan=9 style="background:#000000; color:white;"| Conference games

|-
!colspan=9 style="background:#000000; color:white;"| SEC Tournament

|-
!colspan=9 style="background:#000000; color:white;"| NCAA tournament

See also
2014–15 Georgia Lady Bulldogs basketball team

References

Georgia Bulldogs basketball seasons
Georgia
Georgia
Bulldogs
Bulldogs